The Olive Tree (Elia), full name Olive Tree – Democratic Alignment (Ελιά – Δημοκρατική Παράταξη) was a centre-left electoral alliance. The alliance included the Panhellenic Socialist Movement (PASOK) and minor allies, the Agreement for the New Greece, Dynamic Greece and the New Reformers. The Olive Tree was endorsed by Martin Schulz, the Party of European Socialists' candidate for European Commission presidency.

In the May 2014 European elections, the Olive Tree list came in fourth place nationally, receiving 8.0% of the vote, electing 2 MEPs to the S&D group.

See also
Democratic Coalition (Greece, 2015)

References

External links

Defunct political party alliances in Greece
PASOK
Social democratic parties in Greece
2014 in Greek politics
2014 establishments in Greece
Political parties established in 2014
Parties represented in the European Parliament
Pro-European political parties in Greece